Gąsiorek is a Polish surname. It has several phonetic respellings: Gonsiorek, Gonschorek, and Gonshorek. Notable people with the surname, or one of its variants, include:

 Wiesław Gąsiorek (1936–2002), Polish tennis player
 Dieter Gonschorek (born 1944), East German cyclist

See also
 Gąsior (surname)

Polish-language surnames